The Incredible Detectives is a 1979 animated television special produced by Ruby-Spears Productions and based on the 1972 children's book of the same name by Don and Joan Caufield. It originally aired on ABC Weekend Special series on November 17, 1979.

Synopsis
A trio of pets – Madame Cheng, a slightly vain Siamese cat; Hennessy, a gabby black crow; and Reggie, a sophisticated English bulldog – decide to join forces as "The Incredible Detectives". One day, Davey Morrison – the three pets' master and the son of a government scientist – is kidnapped by a group of underground adversaries. His parents receive a ransom note demanding secret missile plans in exchange for Davey. In desperation, the Morrison family hires Detective Sharpe, a bumbling police detective who quickly gets nowhere with the case. Overhearing the conversation between the Morrisons and the Detective of how Davey disappeared and what the kidnappers want, the family pets swing into action and set out on their own to investigate.

Voices
 Marlene Aragon – Madame Cheng
 Laurie Main – Reggie
 Frank Welker – Hennessy
 Albert Eisenmann – Davey Morrison

Production credits
Executive Producers: Joe Ruby and Ken Spears
Directed by: Rudy Larriva
Produced by: Jerry Eisenberg
Written by: Mark Evanier
Based on the Novel by: Don Caufield, Joan Caufield
Voices: Marlene Aragon, Laurie Main, Frank Welker, Albert Eisenmann, Stan Freberg, Michael Rye, John Stephenson
Animation: Jim Davis, John Freeman, John Howley, Norm McCabe, Fred Myers, Frank Nakielski, Don Orlando, Don Parmele, Bill Pratt, Virgil Raddatz, Bill Reed, Joe Roman, Joanna Romersa, John Shook, Mike Stribling, Marty Taras
Animation Supervisor: Ed Solomon
Assistant Animation Supervisor: Bill Exter
Editor: Richard C. Allen
Post-Production: Lenore Nelson
Production Design: Lew Ott
Production Manager: John Ahern
Production Supervisor: Natalie Shirpser
Assistant Animators: Fred Abranz, Ruben Apodaca, Philo Barnhart, Vincent De Frances, Holly Forsythe, Marion M. Green, Sandy Henkin, Mike Houghton, Leonard C. Johnson, John C. Lange, Anneline Liu, Lester Pourier, Simon Praamsma, Andrew Ramos, Anna Lois Ray, Mary Robertson, Jim Solis, Jim Steel, Gisele Van Bark, Karen Warren, Richard Williams
Layout Artists: Peter Alvarado, Tim Elston, John Freeman, John F. Guerin, Catherine Hart, Tom Knowles, Kathy Vaslett, Pat Wong
Animation Stock: Sandra Benenati
Checking: Myrna Bushman, Rena Cappas, Stephen A. Carr, Lisa Lydon, Jerome B. Stocks
Background Painters: Gary Conklin, Lynn Lascaro, P.S. Lewis, Bill Lorencz, Michele Moen, Monte, Ann Neale, Andy Phillipson, Phil Phillipson, Craig Robertson, Bob Schaefer, Gary Selvaggio, Peter Van Elk, Gloria Wood, Thomas Woodington
Background Stylist: Eric Semones
Xerography and Paint Supervisor: Laura Craig
Color Key Artists: Kit Harper, Bunny Munns
Character Designers: Alan Huck, Carson van Osten, Jim Willoughby
Cel Service: Jim Stocks
Sound Effects Editors: Bruce Elliott, Ron Sawade, Kevin Spears, David Stone
Camera Operators: Larry Hogan, Greg Marshall, Lindsay Rogers, Laurie Toledo
Assistants to Executive Producer: Jodi Berman, Janie Fields, Erika Grossbart
Story Director: Ron Campbell
Voice Director: Alan Dinehart
Studio Manager: Jeff Cooke
Production Assistants: Madlyn Goldberg, Loretta High, Kayte Kuch
Production Controller: Jerry Goldman
Unit Auditor: Henriette Pacile
Lettering: Bob Schaefer
© 1979 Ruby-Spears Productions, Inc.
A FILMWAYS COMPANY

Home video release
The Incredible Detectives was first released on VHS by Worldvision Home Video in 1985. To date, it has not been released on DVD by current rightsholder Warner Home Video.

See also
 List of Ruby-Spears productions
 ABC Weekend Special

References

External links
 
 

1979 television specials
1970s American television specials
ABC Weekend Special
1970s animated television specials
Animated films about animals
Ruby-Spears television specials
American Broadcasting Company television specials
American television shows based on children's books
Detective fiction
Films scored by Dean Elliott